Carmen Miranda: Bananas is My Business is a 1995 documentary filmed and directed by Helena Solberg. This documentary chronicles the life and career of Carmen Miranda, Hollywood's symbol of Latin American spirit in the 1940s. The documentary tells her life story in a series of stages, beginning with her roots and rise to stardom in her home country of Brazil, her transition and development as a performer in the United States, first on Broadway in New York City, then in the film industry after she signed with 20th Century Fox in Los Angeles, and her later years in life, before her death and her return to Brazil. Helena Solberg uses two different film styles, biography and directorial reverie, in which Solberg uses actor Erick Barretos to “resurrect Carmen Miranda in several fantasy sequences. Helena Solberg's attitudes shift throughout the documentary from awe-struck child to empathetic and forgiving Brazilian woman, which she uses to represent the contradictory subplots of Carmen Miranda's life. 
Alongside the fantasy like resurrection of Miranda, Solberg accompanies her documentary with multiple interviews with Carmen Miranda's friends and family, like her sister, her first boyfriend, the guitarist Laurindo Almeida, samba song-writer Synval Silva, Cesar Romero, and Alice Faye.

Brief synopsis
Born in 1909, Carmen Miranda was already famous in Brazil during the 1930s; her discovery by Broadway impresario Lee Shubert in 1939 made her an international star. The film tracks Miranda's astonishing ascent in popularity, from dirt-poor singer and dancer in Rio de Janeiro to Broadway and Hollywood (where she became, in 1945, the highest paid female entertainer in the U.S.). Her success came with a price tag: she was caught between being a "real" Latin American or being Hollywood's version of one—with all the notoriety and fortune it would bring. Today Miranda is a cult figure, known mainly for her exuberant renditions of such songs as "South American Way" and "The Lady in the Tutti-Frutti Hat," performed in garish costumes topped with fruit-filled turbans.

The career start
Carmen Miranda, an almost ghostly character in the imagination of Portuguese, Brazilian, and American audiences, comes back to life in the first scene of the documentary as a dream narrated by Helena Solberg. Images from her memorial service in Rio de Janeiro follow, showing the grief of her Brazilian fans as she says goodbye to what she considered her homeland. Born in the small Portuguese village of Varzea da Ovelha e Aliviada on February 9, 1909, Carmen was appropriated by the people of her village as a symbol of success. Making use of interviews with her younger sister Aurora Miranda, the documentary tales the migration story of Carmen, from Portugal to Brazil, where they arrived in November 1909. Carmen Miranda, daughter of a modest barber, Jose Maria Pinto da Cunha, lived in Rio de Janeiro. There, while working at a hat store, she was first discovered as a singing talent, growing up in Rio de Janeiro, as a working class adolescent, she noticed the strong influence of Samba music as a powerful cultural aspect of life in Rio's slums.

Embracing that current as a way of expressing herself as an artist, Carmen rose through the radio ranks, while “In those days, a girl that sang on the radio was frowned upon… In a world dominated by man, she was able to navigate through those struggles.”As a local artist, she kept a close relationship with composer Synval Silva and Laurindo Almeida until she left for the United States. This opportunity came in 1939, when she performed along her band of Brazilian musicians. Carmen Miranda embarked on The Normandy for New York after being signed by Lee Shubert, who included her in the cast for Broadway play 'The Streets of Paris'. This was the episode that transformed the life of who was later to be known as 'The Brazilian Bombshell'. Once in New York, Carmen Miranda showed how her extravagant looks, and beautiful voice spoke for her, although her American audience could not understand a word she was speaking.

Career in the United States and the fight for her identity
As she became more popular, and stories about her success were heard in Brazil through the media, Brazilians were skeptical of Carmen Miranda's success in New York. Carmen Miranda found herself fighting tirelessly to prove her identity as a Brazilian,  but also to keep the attention from her American audience. Her appropriation of the style would win her many enemies within Brazil, as she represented a sector of Brazilian culture, the Afro-Brazilian, who represented not only the racialized other according to Brazil’s white elite, but were also a threat to national identity. The press and the elite constantly attacked her image, many who “looked at her as an embarrassment and an affront to their cultural heritage”.

Helena Solberg also suggests that Miranda's image was exploited and used by the United States Government during World War II as part of its Good Neighbor Policy, towards Latin America, whose natural resources were vital and needed to fight the war. Even though this would bring credibility to her image, Carmen, in one of her many identities, would eventually lead her to even larger criticism. When Carmen became a blond for her movies in Hollywood, when the World War II was over, the audience back in Brazil bashed her with critics once again, this time saying that she was too ‘Americanized’ However, her American audience seemed to be captivated by the exotic and colorful style of the singer/actress.

She was sensually silly, a comical icon of fertility, and friendliness that threatened no one. Time after time, Carmen Miranda was consumed by sadness, since she knew that her beloved public image as Carmen Miranda was a commodity to be consumed by U.S. audiences, while her value to her people in Brazil declined as she was considered “Americanized.” Solberg includes interviews with Rita Moreno, who offers her critique of Hollywood's stereotyping of Latin American women as  "always left by the guy, you had to be vivacious, fiery! an exaggeration."

Opinions differ about Carmen's image, Cesar Romero says she was out of step with the times, a novelty that wore off. But Alice Faye and others deny that she could have changed her image and still been employed: “You could argue [with the studio],” she says, “but then you were suspended.”

Death and the aftermath
The final stage of the movie chronicles the events leading up to Carmen Miranda's death. In the documentary, Helena Solberg used interviews with Carmen Miranda's closest friends and workers, such as her housekeeper, to show that her troubled marriage to filmmaker David Sebastian and exhausting work schedule led to a deep depression. With doctors' orders, Carmen Miranda took a leave from work and traveled back to Brazil to rest for several weeks. Upon her return to Los Angeles, Carmen Miranda appeared on the NBC television series The Jimmy Durante Show where on August 4, 1955, Carmen Miranda suffered a mild heart attack after completing a dance number with Jimmy Durante. Carmen Miranda fell to her knees, upon which Jimmy Durante told the band to “stop the music” as he helped her to her feet as she laughed, “I'm all out of breath!” Carmen Miranda would finish the show only to later suffer a second, fatal heart attack in her Beverly Hills home.

The documentary showed the service that was held in Los Angeles as well as the return of her body to Rio de Janeiro in accordance with her last wishes. Upon her arrival, the Brazilian government declared a period of national mourning as more than 60,000 people attended a ceremony at the Rio town hall and more than half a million escorted her casket to her final resting place.

Cast

Background

Production 

The film was produced by David Mayer and Helena Solberg, with cinematography by Pole Tomasz Magierski; the rest of the team changed depending on the country where the documentary was being filmed. The film was funded by the Corporation for Public Broadcasting, Public Broadcasting Service, Channel 4 (UK), Radio and Television of Portugal and RioFilme.

The film had a high cost for a documentary, around US$550,000, due to the image rights paid to major studios for the use of Carmen Miranda movies. Through searching, the producers found new images until then unreleased, including home movies of the singer herself, which added a new cost to the use rights.

Release 
The documentary had its world premiere at the 27th Brasilia Film Festival in December 1994, where it won the Audience Award for Best Film, the Special Jury Prize, and the Film Critics' Award. In the U.S., it premiered in New York at the Film Forum and has been televised nationally by the PBS in the POV series.

The docudrama received several awards and was well received by critics at festivals in Chicago, Locarno, Toronto, Melbourne, Yamagata, and London, and closed the year in Havana.

Soundtrack

Festivals

Repercussion 
The film was extremely well received by American criticism. In Brazil, was acquired by networks Canal Brasil and TV Cultura, and the cable channels GNT and Curta!. In Latin America, by the Discovery Channel and Film&Arts. In the United States aired nationally by PBS network, and in France by Canal Plus.

Accolades

Critical reception 
The film received generally positive reviews from critics. Dave Kehr of the Daily News, commented in his review "Carmen Miranda remains one of the most immediately recognizable images in movie history, an explosion of fantasy, energy and playful eroticism" and that the documentary directed by Helena Solberg "is a complex, personal and moving study of a great entertainer who became a victim of the cultural moment she embodied."

In his review of the film, The New York Times critic Stephen Holden wrote, "The film’s clips of Miranda from the Hollywood years are like jolts of electricity, for she exudes an incandescent vitality along with a percussive vocal bravura. It is sad that Hollywood, after crowning her with bananas, couldn’t think of anything else to do with her except to turn that image into a joke."

In his analysis for The Village Voice, Amy Taubin wrote that the film is "fabulous and gorgeous." Godfrey Cheshire in Variety says "Bananas Is My Business provides a fascinating account of mega star."

In his review for The Austin Chronicle, Marjorie Baumgarten recalled that "Bananas Is My Business is a documentary that wants to find the person behind the stereotypical icon of Hollywood."

The New York Magazine wrote that "Bananas is my Business reveals a much more fascinating figure" more criticized the documentary, which in its conception "is flawed in several respects."

Ken Ringle writing for The Washington Post called the film "provocative, affectionate and intelligent" and that "Bananas Is My Business is a treasure house of fascinating reporting." The Time Out magazine wrote that "the most interesting material here relates to Miranda's role as a national symbol for Brazilians, and as the embodiment of Roosevelt's Good Neighbor policy during WWII. The exuberant personality comes through loud and clear, but once she made it in Hollywood, Carmen never varied her act, and it's all too obvious why she was crushed under the weight of all those bananas."

Jonathan Rosenbaum of the Chicago Reader called the film "highly personal and informative, so interesting and intelligent you’re not likely to object."

Tim Purtell for Entertainment Weekly says "Bananas is my Business traces the Brazilian Bombshell's journey from hat maker to South American recording star to Hollywood, where she was typecast as a Latin bimbo. Piquant interviews with Miranda's sister and various musicians and composers mingle with showbiz dish and, in a playful touch, dramatic reenactments by a man in Miranda drag. He's good, but the show belongs to Miranda herself — in clips, home movies, and rare archival footage — performing with a delirious, inimitable vitality."

David Hiltbrand magazine People'''s wrote "this documentary is also an unusually personal essay about Miranda's enduring impact on Pan-American culture and on the imagination of Brazilian filmmaker Helena Solberg. Weaving together news, interviews with intimates, vibrant Technicolor footage from Miranda's films and chimerical dream sequences featuring Carmen impersonator Erik Barreto, this film creates a portrait with both depth and flair."

Roger Hurlburt for Sun Sentinel, wrote that "before adopting the fruit-laden turbans that became her trademark, Miranda was a radio singer. Beautiful, charismatic and optimistic, she once said that all she needed to be happy was a bowl of soup and the freedom to sing (...), she also found herself hovering between two cultures. In Brazil, the press accused her of selling out to Hollywood. At the same time, studio heads refused to allow Miranda to stray from the self-mocking image that made her a top moneymaker, Bananas Is My Business examines with sensitivity and integrity the myth that was Carmen Miranda."

Barry Walters wrote for the San Francisco Chronicle "Miranda was a Madonna, one who never had the freedom to change her image with the passing seasons, and Solberg captures the pain of her crippling fame. The result is both thoroughly entertaining and deeply moving. You'll never think of the lady with the bananas in the same way again."

In its review, the TV Guide magazine says "director Helena Solberg unearths fascinating material about Miranda's early life and importance within Brazilian pop culture (she was jeered as a sell-out during what was supposed to be a triumphant return to her native country). Belying her image as a goofy Latin bomshell, Miranda emerges as a remarkably canny manipulator of her own star persona and career."

Jonathan Rosenbaum wrote that Solberg's documentary is "highly personal and informative–an eye-opener."

In Brazil, Sonia Nolasco wrote for O Estado de S. Paulo that "there are so many surprises and revelations in the documentary "Banana Is My Business" that the viewer gets vexed of ignoring the greatness of our biggest export product." Paul Francis for O Globo said "the film Solberg and Meyer is the first news about the Brazilian cinema that interests me since Barravento."

Luiz Zanin Oricchio wrote for O Estado de S. Paulo that "the film is not a bunch of facts and images. Has an axis, a direction, a thesis without being cold as theorem."

Inácio Araújo, film critic for the Folha de S.Paulo "Bananas is my Business, is a beautiful documentary in which Helena Solberg outlines your profile and the trajetora it would take Carmen Miranda international fame, and premature death, in the reconstitution sector, there is something to question: any attempt to imitate Carmen results inferior to it (especially dance). The documental part compensate it is failure."

Arnaldo Jabor wrote for the Folha de S.Paulo "a precious movie, Helena Solberg and David Meyer, in a research work and lyricism were beyond mere documentary and redesigned not only the rise and fall of Carmen Miranda but also a portrait of our fragility. You need to watch Bananas Is My Business to see who we are."

Nelson Motta in his review for O Estado de S. Paulo wrote that "you laugh, you cry, you falls in love madly for this woman, with enormous eyes, and mouth full of sex, joy and music."

Diogo Mainardi for Veja "Bananas Is My Business should be adopted as the national motto, coined in all currencies. It is our contribution to humanity, bananas, grimaces and smiles."

Zuenir Ventura for the Jornal do Brasil "a definitive and extraordinary film about Carmen Miranda."

References

External links 
 
 
 
 Carmen Miranda: Bananas is My Business at the Bright Lights Film Journal
 
 
 
 Carmen Miranda: Bananas Is My Business at TV Guide
 Carmen Miranda: Bananas is My Business at Yahoo Movies
 Carmen Miranda: Bananas is My Business on MSN Movies

1995 films
Documentary films about entertainers
Brazilian biographical films
British biographical films
Brazilian documentary films
American documentary films
British documentary films
1990s Portuguese-language films
Carmen Miranda
1995 documentary films
POV (TV series) films
American World War II films
Documentary films about women in music
1990s American films
1990s British films